Jamie David Pogue (born August 17, 1977) is a Canadian professional baseball coach who is the bullpen catcher for the St. Louis Cardinals of Major League Baseball (MLB).

Career
Pogue began his collegiate career at Old Dominion University, where he played college baseball for the Old Dominion Monarchs. He transferred to Southern Arkansas University for his senior year, and played for the Southern Arkansas Muleriders. In his senior year, he was named All-Gulf South Conference. He played minor league baseball for nine seasons. He spent three years in the St. Louis Cardinals' organization, and the other six in independent league baseball. Pogue retired as a player in 2008.

Pogue served as the bullpen catcher for the United States national baseball team in the 2009 World Baseball Classic. In 2012, Pogue became a bullpen catcher for the Cardinals.

Personal life
Pogue and his wife, Jeanne, have three daughters, Selena, Madyson, and Skylinn.

See also
 List of St. Louis Cardinals coaches

References

External links

1977 births
Living people
London Werewolves players
Peoria Chiefs players
Texarkana Bulldogs baseball players
New Jersey Cardinals players
Potomac Cannons players
New Haven Ravens players
Long Island Ducks players
Nashua Pride players
Old Dominion Monarchs baseball players
Southern Arkansas Muleriders baseball players
Bridgeport Bluefish players
Major League Baseball bullpen coaches
St. Louis Cardinals coaches
Baseball people from Ontario
Sportspeople from Guelph